The Lost Treasure of Big Audio Dynamite I & II is a compilation album by Big Audio Dynamite. The album was released 9 November 1993 in Japan and Australia only.

The album features 14 remixes of classic Big Audio Dynamite hits, by such pre- and post- acid house remixers as Rick Rubin, Sam Sever, Paul "Groucho" Smykle and Andre Shapps.  On Disc 1, the remixes are intended to enhance, rather than to deconstruct, the songs, allowing the hooks to continue to drive the new versions.  On Disc 2, many recognizable elements of the songs are stripped away, leaving only a rhythmic shell. The album closes with a new song, "Looking for a Song", a future hit for the band, which in this album has not been subject to remixing.

Track listing

CD One

CD Two

References

Big Audio Dynamite albums
1993 compilation albums